i94, I94, or I-94 may refer to:

 Form I-94, a form denoting the Arrival-Departure Record of particular aliens used by U.S. Customs and Border Protection
 I-94, a 1974 film by independent filmmaker James Benning
 i94, former branding of the Lawrence, Indiana contemporary hit radio station WNDX
 I-94, former branding of Honolulu rhythmic contemporary radio station KUBT (93.9FM)
 Interstate 94, the northernmost east–west Interstate Highway connecting the Great Lakes and Intermountain regions of the United States

Broadcast call sign disambiguation pages